Melvin Morgan (born March 31, 1953) is a former American football defensive back in the National Football League. After playing college football for Mississippi Valley State University, Morgan was an 11th round selection (314th overall pick) of the 1976 NFL Draft by the Cincinnati Bengals. He would play for the Bengals (1976–1978) and the San Francisco 49ers (1979–1980). Morgan injured his shoulder in 1980, ending his career.

References

1953 births
Living people
Sportspeople from Gulfport, Mississippi
Players of American football from Mississippi
American football defensive backs
Mississippi Valley State Delta Devils football players
Cincinnati Bengals players
San Francisco 49ers players